Food stamp may refer to:

 Supplemental Nutrition Assistance Program (SNAP), current name for the former U.S. Food Stamp Program
 Ration stamp, used to ration goods, particularly in wartime
 Food Coupon
 Voucher